Cybercenter may refer to:

 Data center, a facility used to house computer systems and associated components
 Internet café, a place which provides internet access to the public, usually for a fee